Hypercompe tessellata is a moth of the subfamily Arctiinae first described by Herbert Druce in 1906. It is found in Peru.

References

Hypercompe
Moths described in 1906